Philipsson is a surname. Notable people with the surname include:

Anette Philipsson (born 1965), former Swedish Olympic swimmer
Lena Philipsson (born 1966), Swedish singer and media personality

See also
Philipson

Patronymic surnames
Surnames from given names